Quintin Cedrick Denyssen (born 27 August 1980) is a South African basketball player with the Egoli Magic of South Africa's Premier Basketball League. He is also a member of the South Africa national basketball team and appeared with the club at the 2007 and 2009 African Championships as well as the 2006 Commonwealth Games.

References

1980 births
Living people
South African men's basketball players